Lutetium(III) fluoride is an inorganic compound with a chemical formula LuF3.

Production
Lutetium(III) fluoride can be produced by reacting lutetium oxide with hydrogen fluoride, or reacting lutetium chloride and hydrofluoric acid:

It can also be produced by reacting lutetium sulfide and hydrofluoric acid:

 (x = 0.9)

Lutetium oxide and nitrogen trifluoride react at 240 °C to produce LuOF. A second step happens below 460 °C to produce LuF3.

References

Lutetium compounds
Fluorides
Lanthanide halides